Joseph Kirk may refer to:

 Joe Kirk (1903–1975), actor
 Joseph Robinson Kirk (1821–1894), Irish sculptor